Cedar Mills is an unincorporated community in Adams County, in the U.S. state of Ohio.

History
A post office was established at Cedar Mills in 1868, and remained in operation until 1909. The community had an iron mill on Cedar Run, hence the name.

References

Unincorporated communities in Adams County, Ohio
1868 establishments in Ohio
Unincorporated communities in Ohio